The Northern Wildcats were a Canadian Junior ice hockey team based out of Longlac, Ontario.  They played out of the North of Superior Junior B Hockey League.

Longlac Merchants 1996 - 1998
Northern Wildcats 1998 - 2002

History
The Longlac Merchants were founded in 1996 and were original members of the North of Superior Junior B Hockey League.

After joining the NSHL in 1996, the Longlac Merchants did not enjoy much success.  In 1998, the team changed their name to the Northern Wildcats but their statistics continued to dwindle.  They folded in 2002, leaving the NSHL with the Wawa Travellers, Marathon Renegades, and the Aguasabon River Rats.

Season-by-season results

Defunct Lakehead Junior Hockey League teams
Sport in Northern Ontario